Locks Heath is a western residential suburb of Fareham, in the south of Hampshire, England. Locks Heath is immediately surrounded by a collection of villages including Sarisbury to the West, Swanwick, Park Gate and Whiteley to the North, Warsash to the South West and Titchfield to the South East. The population of the village itself in 2011 was 7,104 whilst the wider Locks Heath residential area (including surrounding villages) equaled 43,359 as of 2011.

Origin of name

The heathland surrounding Locks Farm.

History

In the late 19th and early 20th Century, the most important local activity in this area was strawberry growing.  The industry developed as a result of the 1866 Enclosure Acts which allowed the common land to be split into a large number of small plots. The new plot owners needed a crop that would give them a quick income from a small outlay. The combination of suitable soils and a mild climate, free from spring frosts, proved ideal for the production of early cropping strawberries. Their early ripening made them desirable in markets across the country. Swanwick railway station opened on 2 September 1889 and helped to facilitate the transportation of large quantities of strawberries to customers all over the country.

Strawberries were transported to the waiting trains by horse and cart.  A lasting reminder of this is a rail on the outside edge of what is now the pavement leading down the hill to the station. This was used to line up the wheels of the horse-drawn carts, so as to enable easy unloading of the carts.  The station was also originally much bigger with what remains of a second branch line still visible under the tarmac of what is now the station car park.  A short way from the station a warehouse can be seen which used to be the 'Swanwick and District Basket Factory' which supplied the baskets to pack the strawberries into for transportation. The outline of the old signage is still visible on the outside of the building.

The strawberry industry hit its peak in the 1920s and then began to slip into decline. This was caused by a variety of factors, including the demand for development land, competition from abroad and the increasingly strict requirements of retailers for standardised products.

Although strawberries are still grown in the area, much of the land once used is now covered with houses. Because of the nature of the plots of land which were once the strawberry farms, many of the houses are built in relatively small estates. The mixture of old and new gives Locks Heath a unique character, and there are numerous references to strawberries in the area, such as The Talisman pub (Talisman being a variety of strawberry) and the Joseph Paxton pub, the name of a locally grown strawberry named after the gardener and designer of Crystal Palace.

St John the Baptist church was built in 1895 to a design by Ewan Christian. It was extended in 1998.

Facilities
The mid-1980s saw significant development of the Locks Heath area with the construction of new housing and The Lockswood centre was built to provide additional facilities including The Lock Stock and Barrel pub (renamed the Strawberry Field Tavern in 2013) and a supermarket operated by Waitrose. The centre now provides a focal point for the area and also includes a library/community centre and a GP surgery which, as of May 2013, is only accepting additional people from Warsash.

Schools
There are many junior schools including St.Johns School and Locks Heath Junior School where most of the Locks Heath infants pupils go to after they leave primary school, Hook-with-Warsash Junior School, Park Gate Primary School and Sarisbury Junior School. The only state secondary school is Brookfield Community School where an average 90% of pupils transfer to.

Sport and leisure
Locks Heath has a Non-League football club Locks Heath F.C. who play at Locks Heath Recreation ground on Warsash Road since 1894. They are currently playing in the Hampshire Premier League.

Locks heath also has another football Club, called Locks Heath Lions for young people ages 5–18.

Also in Locks Heath is a badminton club, bowls and tennis club.

Locks Heath has one pub located within the Locks Heath Shopping Centre, called The Strawberry Tavern, previously known as The Lock Stock and Barrel.

See also
List of places of worship in the Borough of Fareham

Notes

External links
Hook-with-Warsash Junior School
Locks Heath Junior School
Park Gate Primary School
St Johns School
Sarisbury Junior School
Sarisbury, Locks Heath and Warsash Townscape Assessment 2010

Information and history is contained on the  Locks Heath Web site. The local history extract on Wikipedia was quoted from the site and is used with permission.

Populated places in Hampshire
Borough of Fareham